GumTree is an open-source scientific workbench for performing scientific experiments under a distributed network environment. It provides a multi-platform graphical user interface for instrument data acquisition, online or offline data visualisation and analysis. GumTree is designed to provide a highly Integrated Scientific Experiment Environment (ISEE), allowing interaction between different components within the workbench. Several instrument control server systems including TANGO, EPICS and SICS have been adapted to GumTree. Current developments include acquisition, control and analysis on neutron and synchrotron beamlines. In the future it will be extended telescope control and other scientific instruments with distributed hardware.

History
GumTree was first started as a small graphical user interface project to fulfill the IT requirement for the Neutron Beam Instrument Project (NBIP) at ANSTO.  Later in the year, the GumTree project has been approved to go open source for international collaboration.
 02/2004 GumTree project started
 08/2004 GumTree was approved to go open source
 09/2005 GumTree 1.0 milestone 7 released
 03/2006 GumTree has received the Best Open Source RCP Application from the Eclipse Foundation
 01/2007 Codehaus has accepted to host the GumTree Project on their website
 09/2008 GumTree 1.0 released

Architecture
GumTree is based on the Eclipse Rich Client Platform (RCP).  In order to support scientific operations, GumTree extends RCP with data handling framework and visualisation toolkit as part of the GumTree platform API.

GumTree Extension
Adapting GumTree on a particular instrument requires special customisation to fit the scientific workbench to its instrument ecosystem. Customisation of GumTree can be achieved by adding new plug-ins to the existing GumTree application. In a broader sense, the common base of GumTree is a generic platform which provides all the necessary infrastructure to realise the ISEE concept for the scientific instrument. This platform, known as the GumTree Platform, is built and modelled upon an award-winning Java based universal platform called Eclipse. The GumTree Platform consists of an Eclipse Rich Client Platform (RCP) application, and an application framework for handling data exchange, experiment life cycle, device control (via distributed control system e.g. TANGO), application accessibility, data visualisation, and data analysis. All services from the platform can be extended and modified to suit any particular scientific instrument. A developer adds a GumTree workbench (or RCP based GumTree application) which integrates all services provided by the GumTree Platform. The GumTree Platform encourages developers to encapsulate the knowledge of an experiment method or procedure in the workbench.

External links
 Official GumTree website (at web.archive.org) - Project Information, News and Issue Tracking
 SourceForge project page - GumTree project at SF.net.
 GumTree M7 – New and Noteworthy - Available features from the latest GumTree release.

Free science software